Røykeskardhøi or Røykjeskarhøi is a mountain on the border of Skjåk Municipality in Innlandet county and Luster Municipality in Vestland county, Norway. The mountain is surrounded by several other notable mountains including Tverrådalskyrkja and Tundradalskyrkja to the east, Rivenoskulen to the west, and Syrtbyttnosi and Sprongeggi to the northwest.

See also
List of mountains of Norway

References

Skjåk
Luster, Norway
Mountains of Innlandet
Mountains of Vestland